At Carnegie Hall is a live album by The Thelonious Monk Quartet with John Coltrane.

Album information 
It was recorded on 29 November 1957 at "Thanksgiving Jazz", a benefit concert produced by Kenneth Lee Karpe for the Morningside Community Center in Harlem. Other acts performing included Billie Holiday, Dizzy Gillespie, Ray Charles, Sonny Rollins, and Chet Baker with Zoot Sims. The recording, by Voice of America, documents two sets by the Monk Quartet with Coltrane that night – an early set (tracks 1-5) and a late set (tracks 6-9), which the recording does not fully document.

The tape was stored at the Library of Congress where it sat untouched, until 2005 when it was discovered by recording lab supervisor Larry Appelbaum. The recording was then restored by producer Michael Cuscuna and T.S. Monk (Thelonious Monk's son).

Reception 

The recording has been highly praised: Newsweek called it the "musical equivalent of the discovery of a new Mount Everest," and Amazon.com editorial reviewer Lloyd Sachs called it "the ultimate definition of a classic". Soon after its release, it became the #1 best selling music recording on Amazon.com.

The discovery substantially increased coverage of Monk and Coltrane's partnership; the only other recordings known are from 4 sessions that took place in April, June and July 1957 and originally issued on Thelonious Monk with John Coltrane, Monk's Music and Thelonious Himself. Additionally, Discovery! believed to document a reunion at the Five Spot café in 1958, recorded on amateur equipment by Coltrane's first wife.

Track listing 
All tracks composed by Thelonious Monk unless otherwise noted.

 "Monk's Mood" – 7:52
 "Evidence" – 4:41
 "Crepuscule With Nellie" – 4:26
 "Nutty" – 5:03
 "Epistrophy" (Monk, Kenny Clarke) – 4:29
 "Bye-Ya" – 6:31
 "Sweet and Lovely" (Gus Arnheim, Harry Tobias, Jules LeMare) – 9:34
 "Blue Monk" – 6:31
 "Epistrophy" (incomplete) – 2:24

Personnel 
 Thelonious Monk – piano
 John Coltrane – tenor saxophone
 Ahmed Abdul-Malik – bass
 Shadow Wilson – drums

References 

Albums produced by Michael Cuscuna
John Coltrane live albums
Live albums published posthumously
Thelonious Monk live albums
2005 live albums
Blue Note Records live albums
Albums recorded at Carnegie Hall